The Remixes is an EP by British indie rock  band White Lies, released on 17 April 2010 by Fiction Records. The EP was released as part of the 2010 Record Store Day, and limited to 500 copies.

The material, all previously unavailable, consists of remixes of songs taken from the band's debut studio album, To Lose My Life... The final track, "Unfinished Business", was remixed by Jorge Elbrect, lead vocalist and guitarist of Violens, a New York psychedelic rock band who supported White Lies on many of their To Lose My Life... tour dates in the U.K.

The artwork for The Remixes is identical to that of To Lose My Life..., except for the colour, which is inverted.

Track listing

References

White Lies (band) albums
2010 EPs
Remix EPs
2010 remix albums
Record Store Day releases